Caitlin Louise Willis-Pincott (born 18 December 1982) is a former Australian sprinter who competed in international level events. Her highest achievement is winning a gold medal at the 2006 Commonwealth Games in Melbourne in the 4x400m relay. She has also competed at the 2009 and 2011 IAAF World Championships.

She is the younger sister of Benita Willis who also competed at the 2006 Commonwealth Games.

References

1982 births
Living people
Sportspeople from Mackay, Queensland
Athletes from Brisbane
Australian female sprinters
Athletes (track and field) at the 2006 Commonwealth Games
Commonwealth Games gold medallists for Australia
Commonwealth Games medallists in athletics
21st-century Australian women
20th-century Australian women
Medallists at the 2006 Commonwealth Games